is a town located in Mie Prefecture, Japan. , the town had an estimated population of 8,256 in 4,155 households and a population density of 94 persons per km².

Geography
Mihama is located near the southern tip of the Kii Peninsula, facing the Pacific Ocean, in southern Mie Prefecture. Parts of the town are within the borders of the Yoshino-Kumano National Park.

Neighboring municipalities
Mie Prefecture
Kumano
Kihō

Climate
Mihama has a Humid subtropical climate (Köppen Cfa) characterized by warm summers and cool winters with light to no snowfall.  The average annual temperature in Mihama is 15.7 °C. The average annual rainfall is 2596 mm with September as the wettest month. The temperatures are highest on average in August, at around 25.6 °C, and lowest in January, at around 5.8 °C.

Demographics
Per Japanese census data, the population of Mihama has remained relatively steady over the past 40 years.

History
The area of Mihama was part of the holdings of the Kii Tokugawa clan, administered as part of the Kii-Shingū Domain in the Edo period. After the Meiji restoration, the village of Atawa was established within Minamimuro District with the early Meiji period creation of the modern municipalities system on April 1, 1889. It was elevated to town status on October 1, 1933. Atawa Town was merged with two neighboring villages of Ichigioroshi and Kōshiyama to form the town of Mihama on September 1, 1958.

In 2009 the ferry Ariake (ferry) was shipwrecked in Mihama. There were some injuries but all 28 passengers and crew were rescued.

Government
Mihama has a mayor-council form of government with a directly elected mayor and a unicameral town council of 10 members. Mihama, collectively with the city of Kumano and town of Kihō, contributes two members to the Mie Prefectural Assembly. In terms of national politics, the town is part of Mie 4th district of the lower house of the Diet of Japan.

Economy
Mihama serves as a commercial center for the surrounding region. The area is noted for horticulture, and Mihama is known as "The town where you can pick mikan (mandarin oranges) all year long" (Nenju mikan no toreru machi). This phrase is even written on the manhole covers, accompanied by a picture of a smiling orange.

Education
Mihama has four public elementary schools and three public middle schools operated by the city government, and one public high school operated by the Mie Prefectural Board of Education.

Transportation

Railway
 JR Tōkai – Kisei Main Line
 -  -

Highway

Local attractions 
Shichirimihama Beach
Squirrel park
Fudo Falls

Notable people from Mihama
Keiichi Yabu – professional baseball player

References

External links

Mihama official website 

Towns in Mie Prefecture
Populated coastal places in Japan
Mihama, Mie